Simon Leonidsson (born 17 January 1992) is a retired Swedish footballer who played as a forward.

References

External links

1992 births
Living people
Association football forwards
Swedish footballers
Örebro SK players
Allsvenskan players
BK Forward players
Karlslunds IF players
Rynninge IK players
Sweden youth international footballers
Sportspeople from Örebro